The Antigua & Barbuda Athletic Association (ABAA) is the governing body for the sport of athletics in Antigua and Barbuda.  Current president is Rodney Williams.

History 
ABAA was founded in 1960, and was affiliated to the IAAF in 1966.

Affiliations 
ABAA is the national member federation for Antigua and Barbuda in the following international organisations:
International Association of Athletics Federations (IAAF)
North American, Central American and Caribbean Athletic Association (NACAC)
Association of Panamerican Athletics (APA)
Central American and Caribbean Athletic Confederation (CACAC)
Leeward Islands Athletics Association (LIAA)

Moreover, it is part of the following national organisations:
Antigua and Barbuda Olympic Association (ABOA)

National records 
ABAA maintains the Antiguan and Barbudan records in athletics.

References

External links 
ABAA on facebook

National members of the North American, Central American and Caribbean Athletic Association
Sports governing bodies in Antigua and Barbuda
Athletics in Antigua and Barbuda
Sports organizations established in 1960
1960 establishments in Antigua and Barbuda
National governing bodies for athletics
Sports associations